The Ibrah River or Wadi Ibrah (also spelt Ibra) is a river in Darfur in Sudan.  It rises on the southern slopes of the Marrah Mountains, and flows south east to empty into the endorheic Lake Kundi.

References 

Rivers of Sudan
Darfur